Daniel Dugan Reneau, Jr. (born June 11, 1940) is the former president of Louisiana Tech University in Ruston, Louisiana, a position which he filled from July 1, 1987, until his retirement effective June 30, 2013. He was succeeded by Dr. Les Guice.

Background
A native of Woodville in southwestern Mississippi, Reneau graduated from Louisiana Tech in 1963 with a bachelor's degree in chemical engineering. He earned a master's degree in 1964 from the same institution. He received his Ph.D. in 1966 from Clemson University in Clemson, South Carolina. Reneau returned to Louisiana Tech in 1967 to serve as an assistant professor of chemical engineering. He became an associate professor in 1969 and was promoted to full professor in 1973. In 1972, Reneau established the Louisiana Tech biomedical engineering department, only the fifth undergraduate program of its kind, and was named its head. He founded the national biomedical engineering honor society Alpha Eta Mu Beta in 1979.

Reneau's research interests focused upon the application of engineering principles to living systems, the understanding of cerebral palsy, and the use of technology to help people with disabilities. He has published eighty technical papers in books and journals, edited five books, and attended more than one hundred international meetings and conferences.

In 1980, he was promoted to vice president of academic affairs at Louisiana Tech. He had served already for seven years as the university vice-president under President F. Jay Taylor.

University president
On February 20, 1987, Reneau was selected to succeed the retiring Taylor as the 13th president of the institution and assumed the office on July 1 of that year.

In recent years Reneau has struggled with state-mandated cutbacks in higher education:

Louisiana Tech is now a state-assisted university rather than a state-supported university, and that is sad. Not only have we had to do away with programs like the school's dairy and beef herds , but we've had to shift the load to the students in the form of higher fees and tuition.

Despite the funding problems, the institution has received high academic rankings from national organizations. It is one of only two public institutions in Louisiana on the 2012 U.S. News & World Report ranking of Best Colleges. Louisiana Tech ranks in the top 10 nationally for students with the least debt. Louisiana Tech freshmen have consistently had the highest American College Testing scores, and the school has the best graduation rates in the University of Louisiana System, even for a university with a football team. The publication Kiplinger rates the university as one of the "Top 100 Best Values in Public Colleges".

Reneau was succeeded by Leslie K. Guice, a Tech vice-president, whose appointment was confirmed on December 4, 2012, by the University of Louisiana System Board of Supervisors in a special meeting in Baton Rouge. Guice took the helm on July 1, 2013.

In December 2015, Reneau was appointed interim president of the University of Louisiana System. He will succeed temporarily Sandra Woodley, who announced her resignation the preceding month.

Honors
Fellow of the Rehabilitation Engineering Society of North America (1989)
Fellow of the American Institute of Medical and Biological Engineers (2001)
National Federation of the Blind Newel Perry Award (2002)
Tau Beta Pi Distinguished Alumnus (2003)

Personal life
Reneau married Linda Digby, a native of Bernice in Union Parish. The couple has a weekend retreat there with a main house and two cabins. They have two grown children, Dana Reneau Bernhard of Baton Rouge, who is married to Jim Bernhard of The Shaw Group, and Dr. John Reneau of Las Vegas, Nevada, a physician specializing in physical therapy.

References

External links
 404 - File or directory not found.
 2010 Louisiana Tech Football Media Guide by Louisiana Tech Athletics - issuu

1940 births
Living people
Louisiana Tech University alumni
Louisiana Tech University faculty
Clemson University alumni
Presidents of Louisiana Tech University
American chemical engineers
Louisiana Democrats
Fellows of the American Institute for Medical and Biological Engineering